Raise the Pressure is Electronic's second studio album, released in July 1996.

Recording
Seven of the thirteen tracks were composed by full-time members Johnny Marr and Bernard Sumner, and the other six co-written with former Kraftwerk member Karl Bartos. He was recommended to Electronic via a friend of Sumner's, and commuted to Manchester throughout 1995 during the recording sessions, which stretched from late 1994 to late 1995.

The protracted sessions resulted in a dense, thick production that was later acknowledged by both Sumner and Marr and criticised in professional reviews; they consequently spent much less time on their next album Twisted Tenderness.

Raise the Pressure was also remarked upon for Bernard Sumner's impressionistic lyrics, which some saw as the result of his use of Prozac during this period, following an appearance on the BBC 2 programme The Late Show, which explored the effects of the antidepressant on creativity. According to Sumner, however, he only wrote one lyric whilst under the influence of Prozac. Musically the album comprises guitar pop/rock songs ("One Day", "Out of My League") and more dance oriented tracks ("Until the End of Time", "If You've Got Love").

Artwork
The album cover is a painting of a cherub by Johannes Handschin, which echoes the sleeve of New Order's 1989 album Technique. The title of the album appears on the inner inlay sleeve of most CD releases; the Australian CD and cassette editions are two which have Raise the Pressure placed on the cover. This was the last Electronic album to be released on vinyl.

Reception

Unlike its predecessor Electronic, Raise the Pressure received mixed reviews and did not perform as well commercially, with the first two singles "Forbidden City" and "For You" charting modestly in the UK Top 20, and the third, "Second Nature", barely making the Top 40. In the US no commercial singles were released, with "Forbidden City" and "Second Nature" issued only as promotional radio-play discs. Four mixes of "Until the End of Time" were released through the Electronic mailing list in October 1997; this item and a maxi single of "Second Nature" remixes are among the most sought-after recordings by the band.

In 2007 a download-only edition of Raise the Pressure was released on the iTunes Store, adding all five B-sides from the single releases. The remixes of "Until the End of Time" were also released on iTunes at this time.

Track listings

Standard edition
 "Forbidden City" – 4:03
 "For You" – 4:52
 "Dark Angel" – 5:30
 "One Day" – 4:35
 "Until the End of Time" – 6:19
 "Second Nature" – 4:55
 "If You've Got Love" – 6:26
 "Out of My League" – 4:36
 "Interlude" – 0:44
 "Freefall" – 4:58
 "Visit Me" – 5:58
 "How Long" – 4:46
 "Time Can Tell" – 4:43
 The B-side "All That I Need" appeared on the Japanese edition.

iTunes bonus tracks
 "Imitation of Life" – 3:47
 "A New Religion" – 4:15
 "All That I Need" – 7:09
 "I Feel Alright" – 4:48
 "Turning Point" – 5:35

Personnel
Bernard Sumner: vocals and keyboards
Johnny Marr: guitars, bass and keyboards
Produced by Electronic
Engineered by James Spencer
Thanks to Karl Bartos (keyboards), Denise Johnson (vocals), Ged Lynch (drums and percussion), Donald Johnson (drums on 4), Danny Saber (organ on 8), Guy Pratt (bass on 13), Alan Meyerson (mixing 1, 4, 5, 6, 7, 9, 12 & 13), James Spencer (mixing 2, 3, 8, 10 & 11), Andrew Berry, Russell Kearney, Kevin Jacobs, J.C., Ben Findlay, Jon Savage, Marcus Russell, Alec McKinlay, Abby Scott and all at Ignition.
Cover illustration by Johannes Handschin.
Electronic logo by Paul Barnes.
Designed by Howard Wakefield @ Meiré und Meiré and Peter Saville.
1, 2, 5, 7, 12 & 13 written by Marr, Sumner and Bartos.
3, 4, 6, 8, 9, 10 & 11 written by Marr and Sumner.

Charts

References

External links
 feel every beat (unofficial website)
 worldinmotion.net (unofficial website)

1996 albums
Electronic (band) albums
Parlophone albums